Mount Stuart is a rural locality and settlement in South Otago, New Zealand. It is located between Manuka Creek and Glenore on State Highway 8, approximately halfway between Milton and Waitahuna. It sits close to the upper reaches of the west branch of the Tokomairiro River, just below the confluence with the Manuka Stream.

Mount Stuart is notable for its  tunnel (also known as the Manuka Creek tunnel), formerly part of an access line for the Roxburgh Branch rail line, which is now open as a walking track. The 7.7 MW Mount Stuart Wind Farm, located 4km to the northwest of the settlement, was commissioned in 2012.

References

Populated places in Otago